El Porvenir (Spanish: "The Future") is a municipio (municipality) and township in the Mexican state of Chiapas.

El Porvenir was given town status with the creation of the municipality on 13 January 1890.
The city was formally known as El Porvenir de Velasco Suárez in honour of prominent neurologist Manuel Velasco Suárez, Governor of Chiapas during the period 1970 to 1976, but that nomenclature is now considered obsolete.

It is the second-highest municipal seat in Mexico, trailing only the seat of Emiliano Zapata Municipality, Tlaxcala. The municipality covers a total surface area of 121.70 km² and, in the 2010 census, reported a population of 13,201 inhabitants. Of this total, 1,436 lived in the municipal seat, its only urban locality.

On August 27, 2001 President Vicente Fox attended a ceremony in El Porvenir in which the municipality was officially twinned with San Pedro Garza García,
Nuevo León, thus symbolically uniting the country's industrial, developed north with its rural, underdeveloped south.

References

External links
El Porvenir municipality (Enciclopedia de los municipios de México)
Firma del Convenio de Hermanamiento de El Porvenir San Pedro Garza García (Presidencia de México)

Municipalities of Chiapas